Maitrayee Patar is an Indian writer poet and musical artist from Assam best known for her work in Assamese literature and new-age music. She married IIT-B alumnus Arindam Baruah in 2020.

Early life and education
Patar was born in Guwahati on 7 April 1990, belongs to Tiwa community (an indigenous Assamese community). She did her post-graduation in Sociology from the Delhi School of Economics. She also pursued Master of Philosophy in Women's studies from the Tata Institute of Social Sciences, Mumbai.

Career

Literature
Patar is the author of poetry book Mor Kolmou Dinor Xonali Baat (2015).

She had been
selected for Poets Translating Poets 2019 (January) edition, the prestigious cultural exchange
workshop of literature of German and Indian languages, hosted by Goethe Institut.

Patar's poetry engages with, describes, or considers the natural world as well as the life of the women. Most of her poems have been translated into other Indian and foreign languages such as Italian, Tiwa, Nepali, Hindi, and Malayalam. She is a regular writer of leading literary magazines Krittibas, Satsori, Prakash, Nebedan and Jatra.

Music
She is known for her New-age music under the banner of Baartalaap. Rolling Stone India added Patar's Alternative rock song Dur Ximonat in their first playlist of 2020.

Activism
Patar along with the writers’ community of Assam demanded the release of Krishak Mukti Sangram Samiti founder Akhil Gogoi, who  lodged in jail for his position within the anti-CAA protest.

References

External links

1990 births
Writers from Assam
Writers from Northeast India
Living people
People from Guwahati
Assamese playback singers
Assamese-language singers
Bollywood playback singers
Indian women singers
Indian women playback singers
Indian women pop singers
Performers of Hindu music
Singers from Assam
Singers from Guwahati